The Colorado Buffaloes football program represents the University of Colorado Boulder in college football at the NCAA Division I FBS level. The team is a member of the Pac-12 Conference, having previously been a charter member of the Big 12 Conference. Before joining the Big 12, they were members of the Big Eight Conference. The CU football team has played at Folsom Field since 1924.  The Buffs all-time record is 716–520–36 (.577 winning percentage) as of the 2022 season. Colorado won the 1990 National Championship.  The football program is 27th on the all-time win list and 40th in all-time winning percentage.

History

Beginning in 1890, Colorado football has enjoyed much success throughout its more than 135 years of competitive play.

The Buffaloes have appeared in numerous bowl games (28 appearances in bowl games (12–16), 36th all-time), and won 27 conference championships, 5 division championships and an AP national championship in 1990.

Folsom Field was built in 1924, and since then, Colorado has a 308–169–14 record at home through the 2016 season. The road game against the Nebraska Cornhuskers on November 24, 2006, was Colorado's 1,100th football game.  The game on September 12, 2015, against Massachusetts was the school's 1,200th football game.

Conference affiliations
 Independent (1890–1892, 1905)
 Colorado Football Association (1893–1904, 1906–1908)
 Colorado Faculty Athletic Conference (1909)
 Rocky Mountain Faculty Athletic Conference (1910–1937)
 Mountain States Conference (1938–1947)
 Big Eight Conference (1948–1995)
 Big 12 Conference (1996–2010)
 Pac-12 Conference (2011–present)

Championships

National championships
Colorado won one national championship in football for 1990.

1990 season

Colorado won the national championship in 1990 under the direction of head coach Bill McCartney, who helmed the team from 1982 to 1994. While the Georgia Tech won the United Press International Coaches Poll, Colorado won the Associated Press, Football Writers Association of America and other polls.  Colorado played the most difficult schedule in the country, beat more ranked teams and conference champions, and had a more talented roster. Colorado capped the season with a 10–9 win over Notre Dame in the Orange Bowl, a rematch of the 1989 season Orange Bowl Game which Notre Dame won 21–6. Colorado's tie came against Tennessee, who was ranked No. 8, the first week of the season when Colorado was ranked No. 5. The second week gave the Buffs a scare, scoring with 12 seconds left in the game on a 4th and Goal attempt. The next week gave Colorado its only loss of the season, losing 23–22 to Illinois and dropping Colorado to No. 20 in the polls. Colorado then went on to beat teams ranked (at the time) No. 22 Texas, No. 12 Washington, No. 22 Oklahoma, and No. 3 Nebraska. They ended the season 7–0 in the Big Eight Conference for the second straight season. They then capped the season with a win over Notre Dame who were number 1 until a loss in their second to last game of the regular season.

Conference championships

Colorado has won 26 conference championships in over a century of college play, spanning through five conferences.

† Co-champions

Division championships

† Co-champions

Head coaches

The Buffaloes have played in 1,109 games during their 125 seasons, through 2014. In those seasons, 11 coaches have led Colorado to postseason bowl games: Bunny Oakes, Dallas Ward, Marcel M. Mazur, Bud Davis, Eddie Crowder, Bill Mallory, Bill McCartney, Rick Neuheisel, Gary Barnett, Dan Hawkins, Mike MacIntyre and Karl Dorrell. Ten coaches have won conference championships with the Buffaloes: Fred Folsom, Myron Witham, William Saunders, Oakes, Jim Yeager, Sonny Grandelius, Mallory, McCartney and Barnett. The Buffaloes won the national championship in 1990, and have won a total of 28 conference championships.

McCartney is the all-time leader in games coached with 153, total wins with 93, and conference wins with 58. Folsom had the longest tenure as head coach, remaining in the position for 15 seasons. Harry Heller and Willis Keinholtz are tied for the highest overall winning percentage. Each served a single season and won eight of his nine games for a winning percentage of .889. Of coaches who served more than one season, Folsom leads with a .765 winning percentage. Davis, in terms of overall winning percentage, is the worst coach the Buffaloes have had with a .200 winning percentage. No Colorado coach has been inducted into the College Football Hall of Fame, although McCartney was inducted into the Orange Bowl Hall of Fame in 1996.

Mike MacIntyre had brief success with the program. Hired on Dec. 10, 2012, MacIntyre compiled a 30–44 record over five-plus seasons at Colorado. In 2016, MacIntyre lead Colorado to a 10-2 regular season and a trip to the Pac-12 Championship Game. It was the first winning season for Colorado since 2005, ending a 10-year streak of finishing below .500. 2016 was also the best season for the Buffaloes since 2001. As well, it marked their first time playing in a conference championship game since the 2005 Big 12 Championship Game. The team also went 8–2 in the Pac-12 after having five conference wins in the previous five seasons. Mike MacIntyre was named the Walter Camp 2016 Coach of the Year by the Walter Camp Foundation, the second Colorado football coach to earn the honor (Bill McCartney in 1989). MacIntyre was also awarded the 2016 Pac-12 Coach of the Year, American Football Coaches Association's coach of the year and comeback coach of the year awards, the Associated Press coach of the year, and the Eddie Robinson coach of the year by the Football Writers Association of America. In 2018, the Buffaloes started out the season 5–0 with wins against rivals Colorado State, Nebraska, Arizona State, and UCLA - however, MacIntyre was fired as the head coach on November 18, 2018, after a six-game losing streak.

Mike Sanford was named interim Head Coach after Karl Dorrell was fired during the 2022 season, Sanford was previously the Buffaloes Offensive Coordinator for the start of the 2022 campaign. On December 3, Colorado announced Deion Sanders as Head Football Coach.

Venues

 Campus fields (1890–1901) 
 Gamble Field (1901–1924) 
 Folsom Field (1924–present)

Rivalries

Nebraska

A traditional college football rivalry with the Nebraska Cornhuskers restarted in the 1980s (many historical documents show the importance of this game going back to 1898) when Bill McCartney declared the conference opponent to be their rival. His theory was since Nebraska was such a powerhouse team, if Colorado was able to beat them then they would be a good team. Colorado began to repeatedly threaten Nebraska in the late 1980s, following their win over the Huskers in 1986, and then surpassed the Huskers for the Big 8 crown in 1989.

In 1990, Colorado beat Nebraska 27–12 in Lincoln for the first time since 1967, en route to their first national title. From 1996 to 2000, the series was extremely competitive, with the margin of victory by NU in those five years being only 15 points combined. The rivalry was further buoyed by the introduction of the Big 12 Conference in 1996, which moved Oklahoma and Oklahoma State to the southern division with the four new schools from Texas, formerly in the Southwest Conference. Nebraska had traditionally finished the Big 8 conference schedule with a rivalry game with Oklahoma, but the two were now in different divisions, which meant they met every other year in the regular season. Colorado replaced Oklahoma as Nebraska's final conference game of the regular season, which further intensified the rivalry. In 2001 No. 1 Nebraska came to Folsom Field undefeated and left at the short end of a nationally televised 62–36 blowout. Both teams departed the Big 12 in 2011, as NU headed east to join the Big Ten and the future of the rivalry was in doubt. On February 7, 2013, Colorado and Nebraska agreed to renew the rivalry. Colorado traveled to Lincoln in 2018 and won 33–28 (winning against Nebraska for the first time since 2007 and the first time in Lincoln since 2004). On September 7, 2019, Colorado mounted an improbable comeback after being down 17–0 at half, to win the game in overtime, 34–31. After a 3-year break, Nebraska will go to Boulder in 2023 and then host CU again the next year to finish the series. Nebraska leads the series 49–20–2 through the 2019 season.

Colorado State

Colorado's in-state rival is the Colorado State Rams of the Mountain West Conference, located north of Boulder in Fort Collins. The two schools are separated by 45 miles (72 km) and both consider it important and noteworthy to beat the other for bragging rights for the next year. The two football teams annually compete in the Rocky Mountain Showdown for the Centennial Cup, played in Denver, Fort Collins, and Boulder. The trophy takes its name from the state of Colorado's nickname of "The Centennial State". Colorado leads the series 67–22–2 through the 2019 season.

Utah

The rivalry with Utah ran from 1903 to 1962, in which Utah and Colorado played each other nearly every year; through 1962 they had met 57 times. At the time, it was the second-most played rivalry for both teams (Utah had played Utah State 62 times; Colorado had played Colorado State 61 times). The rivalry was dormant until 2011, when both teams joined the Pac-12, renewing the rivalry on an annual basis. The Colorado–Utah rivalry remains the fifth-most played rivalry in Utah's history, and eighth-most in Colorado's history. Utah leads the series 34-32-3 through the 2022 season.

Bowl games

Notable players

Pro Football Hall of Fame
Colorado has one inductee into the Pro Football Hall of Fame.
Cliff Branch – WR (1972–1988); HoF Class of 2022

Notable players

Dick Anderson 
Bobby Anderson 
Troy Archer 
Tom Ashworth 
Chidobe Awuzie 
David Bakhtiari
Estes Banks 
Marlon Barnes 
Brad Bedell 
Mitch Berger 
Frank Bernardi 
Tony Berti 
Greg Biekert 
Eric Bieniemy 
Jeremy Bloom
Frank Bosch 
Ronnie Bradford 
Cliff Branch 
Tyler Brayton
Paul Briggs 
Pete Brock 
Stan Brock 
Tom Brookshier 
Chad Brown 
Chris Brown 
Jalil Brown 
Bill Brundige 
Larry Brunson 
Cullen Bryant 
Brian Cabral 
J.V. Cain 
Brian Calhoun 
Gary Campbell 
Jeff Campbell
Rae Carruth 
Darrin Chiaverini 
Franklin Clarke 
Shannon Clavelle 
Mark Cooney 
Eric Coyle
Claude Crabb 
Ken Crawley 
Mason Crosby 
T. J. Cunningham 
Brian Daniels 
Charlie Davis 
Mike Davis 
John Denvir 
Koy Detmer 
Tyson DeVree 
Jordon Dizon 
Jeff Donaldson 
Eddie Dove 
Boyd Dowler 
Justin Drescher 
Jon Embree 
Christian Fauria 
Mark Fenton 
Deon Figures 
Bill Frank 
Joe Garten 
Daniel Graham
Charlie Greer 
Dan Grimm 
Andre Gurode 
D.J. Hackett 
Carroll Hardy 
Don Hasselbeck
Dennis Havig 
Mark Haynes 
Ralph Heck 
Barry Helton
Jerry Hillebrand 
Merwin Hodel 
Darius Holland 
Greg Horton 
Hale Irwin 
Heath Irwin 
Brian Iwuh 
Charles Johnson 
Charlie Johnson 
Ken Johnson 
Richard Johnson 
Sam Rogers 
Ted Johnson 
Brad Jones 
Fred Jones 
Greg Jones 
Vance Joseph 
Ben Kelly 
Jon Keyworth 
Mark Koncar 
Joe Klopfenstein 
Gary Knafelc 
Mark Koncar 
Mike Kozlowski 
Terry Kunz 
Jay Leeuwenburg 
Matt Lepsis 
Michael Lewis 
Phillip Lindsay
Dave Logan 
Wayne Lucier 
Vaka Manupuna 
Bo Matthews 
Matt McChesney 
Dave McCloughan 
Mike McCoy 
Kanavis McGhee 
Odis McKinney
Scotty McKnight 
Ron Merkerson 
Matt Miller
Mike Montler 
Emery Moorehead 
Chris Naeole 
Garry Howe
Chris Hudson 
Hannibal Navies 
Erik Norgard 
Gabe Nyenhuis 
Herb Orvis 
Whitney Paul
Rod Perry 
Tyler Polumbus 
Mike Pritchard 
Mickey Pruitt 
Vince Rafferty
Tony Reed 
Leonard Renfro 
Paul Richardson 
Sam Rogers 
Tom Rouen 
Lee Rouson 
Matt Russell 
Rashaan Salaam
Victor Scott
Jimmy Smith 
Nate Solder 
Ariel Solomon 
Nelson Spruce 
John Stearns
Kordell Stewart 
Donald Strickland 
Quinn Sypniewski 
Sean Tufts
Kanan Ray
Lawrence Vickers 
Thaddaeus Washington 
Michael Westbrook 
Byron White 
Sam Wilder
Alfred Williams 

Darian Hagan

Awards

Heisman Trophy:

Other award winners

Players

Walter Camp Award
Rashaan Salaam – 1994
Dick Butkus Award
Alfred Williams – 1990
Matt Russell – 1996
Doak Walker Award
Rashaan Salaam – 1994
Draddy Trophy
Jim Hansen – 1992

Jim Thorpe Award
Deon Figures – 1992
Chris Hudson – 1994
John Mackey Award
Daniel Graham – 2001
Ray Guy Award
Mark Mariscal – 2002

Coach
Paul "Bear" Bryant Award
1989 Bill McCartney
Walter Camp Coach of the Year Award
2016 Mike MacIntyre
Dodd Trophy as Coach of the Year
2016 Mike MacIntyre
Associated Press Coach of the Year Award
2016 Mike MacIntyre
Home Depot Coach of the Year Award
2016 Mike MacIntyre
FWAA/Eddie Robinson Coach of the Year Award
2016 Mike MacIntyre
Pac-12 Conference Football Coach of the Year
2016 Mike MacIntyre

College Football Hall of Fame

All-Americans

The following is a list of Consensus All-Americans from CU as listed in NCAA record books.

 1943 Robert Hall, Colorado (AP-2)
 1953 Gary Knafelc, Colorado (AP-3)
 1954 Frank Bernardi, Colorado (AP-2)
 1956 John Bayuk, Colorado (INS-2; CP-3)
 1960 Joe Romig, Colorado (WC)
 1961 Joe Romig, Colorado (WC, TSN, FWAA)
 1961 Jerry Hillebrand, Colorado (FWAA)
 1967 Dick Anderson, Colorado (AP, NEA)
 1968 Mike Montler, Colorado (AP, AFCA)
 1969 Bobby Anderson, Colorado (AP, UPI, NEA, TSN)
 1970 Pat Murphy, Colorado (WC)
 1970 Don Popplewell, Colorado (AP, UPI, NEA, FWAA, WC, CP, FN)
 1971 Herb Orvis, Colorado (WC, AFCA, TSN)
 1971 Cliff Branch, Colorado (FN)
 1972 Cullen Bryant, Colorado (UPI, NEA, AFCA, TSN, Time)
 1972 Bud Magrum, Colorado  (FWAA)
 1973 Bo Matthews, Colorado (Time)
 1973 J.V. Cain, Colorado (TSN, Time)
 1975 Troy Archer, Colorado (Time)
 1975 Pete Brock, Colorado  (TSN, NEA, Time)
 1975 Dave Logan, Colorado    (TSN)
 1975 Mark Koncar, Colorado (AP)
 1976 Don Hasselbeck, Colorado (TSN)
 1978 Matt Miller, Colorado (UPI)
 1979 Mark Haynes, Colorado (AP)
 1979 Stan Brock, Colorado (TSN)
 1986 Barry Helton, Colorado (AP, UPI, TSN)
 1988 Keith English, Colorado (AP)
 1989 Tom Rouen, Colorado (AP, UPI, WC, FWAA)
 1989 Kanavis McGhee, Colorado (WC)
 1989 Alfred Williams, Colorado (UPI, AFCA, FWAA, FN)
 1989 Darian Hagan, Colorado (TSN)
 1989 Joe Garten, Colorado (AP, UPI, AFCA, FWAA, TSN)
 1990 Alfred Williams, Colorado (AP, UPI,  NEA, WC, AFCA, FWAA, SH, TSN, FN)
 1990 Joe Garten, Colorado  (AP, UPI, NEA, WC, AFCA, FWAA, SH, TSN, FN)
 1990 Eric Bieniemy, Colorado (AP, UPI, NEA, WC, AFCA, FWAA, SH, TSN, FN)
 1991 Joel Steed, Colorado (WC)
 1991 Jay Leeuwenburg, Colorado (AP, UPI, NEA, WC,  AFCA, FWAA, SH, TSN, FN)
 1992 Mitch Berger, Colorado (UPI)
 1992 Deon Figures, Colorado (AP, UPI, NEA, WC, FWAA, SH, TSN, FN)
 1992 Michael Westbrook, Colorado  (NEA)
 1994 Chris Hudson, Colorado  (Associated Press, Walter Camp, FWAA-Writers, Scripps-Howard)
 1994 Michael Westbrook, Colorado  (Walter Camp, AFCA-Coaches, Sporting News)
 1994 Rashaan Salaam, Colorado  (Associated Press, Walter Camp, FWAA-Writers, AFCA-Coaches, Scripps-Howard, Sporting News, Football News)
 1995 Bryan Stoltenberg, Colorado (UPI, Walter Camp, FN)
 1995 Heath Irwin, Colorado (AP)
 1996 Matt Russell, Colorado (AP, FWAA-Writers, Walter Camp, TSN)
 1996 Chris Naeole, Colorado (AP, AFCA-Coaches, Walter Camp, FN)
 1996 Rae Carruth, Colorado (TSN)
 1999 Ben Kelly, Colorado (FN, CNNSI-KR)
 2001 Roman Hollowell, Colorado (TSN, CNNSI-PR)
 2001 Andre Gurode, Colorado (AP, TSN, PFW, CNNSI)
 2001 Daniel Graham, Colorado (Walter Camp, AFCA-Coaches, FWAA, AP, TSN, PFW, FN)
 2002 Mark Mariscal, Colorado (AP, AFCA-Coaches, Walter Camp, TSN, CNNSI, ESPN)
 2002 Wayne Lucier, Colorado (TSN)
 2002 Chris Brown, Colorado (AFCA-Coaches)
 2004 John Torp, Colorado (ESPN)
 2005 Mason Crosby, Colorado (Associated Press, FWAA-Writers, Walter Camp, Sporting News, Sports Illustrated, Pro Football Weekly, ESPN, CBS Sports, College Football News, Rivals.com)
 2006 Mason Crosby, Colorado (Walter Camp Foundation, Pro Football Weekly)
 2007 Jordon Dizon, Colorado (Associated Press, Walter Camp, Sporting News, ESPN, College Football News, Rivals.com)
 2010 Nate Solder, Colorado (AP, FWAA, TSN, WCFF, ESPN, PFW, SI)

Future non-conference opponents
Announced schedules as of January 6, 2022.

Others beyond 2030: vs. Missouri, Aug. 30, 2031; at SMU, Sept. 6, 2031; vs. North Texas, Sept. 4, 2032; at North Texas, Sept. 3, 2033; vs. Colorado State, Sept. 17, 2033; at Colorado State, Sept. 16, 2034; at Oklahoma State, Sept. 13, 2036; vs. Oklahoma State, Sept. 12, 2037; vs. Colorado State, Sept. 19, 2037; at Colorado State, Sept. 11, 2038.

References

External links

 

 
American football teams established in 1890
1890 establishments in Colorado